Unnakai (also called Unnakaya, Kai Ada, Unnakka, and Kai Porichathu) is a spindle shaped sweet dessert made chiefly of plantain. It originated from the Malabar region of India, and is often eaten at weddings, Iftar and other festivities.

The main ingredient of this dish is steamed and mashed plantain, which is a staple in Kerala, India. The relatively dry puree becomes the dough, which is rolled and flattened into patties. These patties are stuffed with sweetened beaten egg, scrapped flesh of coconut, nuts, raisins and cardamom, a spice which is rolled into the shape of a spindle with oiled palm. The stuffed dough is then deep fried in coconut oil, and is either consumed as a snack or topped with sago-based white sauce so that it can be served as a dessert.

Variations are made by varying the ingredients used in the filling. In certain parts of the region coconut is completely avoided, and the filling is made with just egg, sugar and nuts.

See also
Chatti Pathiri
 List of stuffed dishes

References

External links

Kerala cuisine
Plantain dishes
Stuffed desserts
Deep fried foods

ml:കായട